Nico (known as Nicholas in most non-Spanish-speaking countries) is a 2001 Spanish animated television series produced by BRB Internacional, Televisión Española and the National Organization of the Spanish Blind. The title character, Nico, is a boy that is blind. Blind people in the cartoon are usually referred to as "visually impaired" (invidente) regardless of how severe, or otherwise, their blindness is.

The series raised awareness of progresses being made in cities as they became more blind-friendly.  It also educated children about blind people.

Characters
Nico is initially introduced as moving to a new school, where the rest of the main characters, his classmates, are introduced.  In the first episode, he states that he progressively lost his sight, and was therefore integrated into a school for visually impaired people for the last few years.  This is later retconned to him being blind from birth: This was expressed explicitly in one episode, he tells a supermodel that has recently lost her sight that it is best to have been able to see once, than to never have seen like him.

Other characters include:
 Tom, Nico's guide dog who every now-and-then makes side-comments to the audience.
 Patty, Nico's neighbor, classmate, and best friend. She always ties her blonde hair in a pony tail.
 Oscar, a classmate that perpetually chews bubble gum, who always tried to trick Nico or Tom into tripping or getting into trouble. He feels that Nico is stealing his popularity.
 Flappy (so named because he wiggles his ears too much), Oscar's dim-witted and good-hearted, yet only, henchman. He is a bit egocentrical, believes he has psychokinetic powers, and has a short stature.
 Aisha, Nico's classmate of African descent who perpetually is trying to invent something. Seems to be allergic to Flappy.
 Tábata, Nico's baby sister
 Boris, Nico's family's ever-hungry pet chameleon, who more than changing color, changes his shape. Always seen chasing a bug.
 Charlie, Nico's classmate of Japanese descent. He loves small creatures in general and carries a different insect or rodent around in his pocket in each episode hoping to care for it, much to the dislike of the creature in question. The creature always ends up escaping near the end of the episode, usually after interacting with Boris or Tom.
 Caifás, Nico's elderly, ill-humored, and very rich neighbor. He hates children in general, but he hates blind ones even more so. On one occasion, for example, he built a robotic bat for the sole purpose of bothering Nico.
 Nico's teachers

Episode guide
A list of episodes

Episodes
 Episode 1  - The New Kid has Arrived
 Episode 2  - The Test
 Episode 3  - The Asphalt Jungle
 Episode 4  - Your Voice Sounds Familiar
 Episode 5  - Six dots to Move the World
 Episode 6  - In the Mist
 Episode 7  - Hearts of Gold
 Episode 8  - With Permission
 Episode 9  - Orange at three o'clock
 Episode 10 - The Fountain of Perception
 Episode 11 - White Christmas 
 Episode 12 - Do touch, Please
 Episode 13 - Things I Once Saw
 Episode 14 - Binary Sensations
 Episode 15 - Pirates
 Episode 16 - Blind Date
 Episode 17 - The Ghost Story
 Episode 18 - A Flea-bitten Dog
 Episode 19 - Tomorrow When it Dawns
 Episode 20 - Team Tactics
 Episode 21 - Nice sense of smell, mate
 Episode 22 - You don't see me, you don't hear me
 Episode 23 - Historical Guides
 Episode 24 - The Age of Discoveries
 Episode 25 - A Wonderful Cast
 Episode 26 - A future for all of us

Duration
Each of the 26 episodes lasts 26–30 minutes.

Episode structure
The episodes usually showed a modern city, but frequently featured improbable plots (one episode, for example, included a time machine that took a handful of characters to the past). Usually, there was a background story involving the animal characters Tom and/or Boris.

Many episodes happening in a believable scenario featured a reduction in visibility (e.g. smoke from a building on fire) where Nico would save the day by quickly telling people how to "see" without using their eyes, enabling them to, in the above case, escape the building before the fire spread.

Closure
Each episode closed with a "Watch Out!" (¡Cuidado!) segment narrated by Tom.  It consisted of stating a little-known fact of what blind people can now do.  Each segment typically started out with something along the lines of "You think someone that is visually impaired can't go skiing?" and then proceeded to explain, in the given example, that blind people can ski if a guide skis in front of them with a speaker on his/her backpack to shout warnings at the skier, and the blind person following the sound of his/her guide's skis sliding on the snow.  The example would then be followed by some sort of more or less comical note, to which Tom winked at the audience.  (In the above case, Tom commented that crossing the path between a blind skier's guide and the blind skier can lead to accidents, while the accident depicted on screen isn't particularly that of the blind skier, but of the person who got in the way.) Often, these "Watch Out!" notes were a show of a much later episode.

Immediately afterwards, Nico's voice would give an advance of what the next episode would be about, while brief images of that episode appeared on screen.

During the credits, a comical sequence where Boris chased a dragonfly was shown.

See also
 Blindness and education
 Blindness in literature
 BRB Internacional
 ONCE

References

2001 Spanish television series debuts
2001 Spanish television series endings
Spanish children's animated television series
Fictional blind characters
RTVE shows
Television shows about blind people